Bay Meadows Breeders' Cup Handicap  was an American Thoroughbred horse race held annually since 1934 at Bay Meadows Racetrack in San Mateo, California.  Held in late September, the Bay Meadows Breeders' Cup Handicap  is currently an ungraded stakes event for 3-year-olds and up, raced on turf at a distance of 1 1/8-miles with a purse of $150,000.

Inaugurated in 1934 as the Bay Meadows Handicap, on November 28, 2007 this Grade III stakes race was downgraded to an ungraded stakes by the American Graded Stakes Committee.

Partial list of past winners 

2008 : Bold Chieftain
2007 : Now Victory
2006 : Flamethrowintexan
2005 : Adreamisborn
2004 : Needwood Blade
2003 : Mister Acpen
2002 : David Copperfield
2001 : Super Quercus
2000 : Devine Wind
1999 : Kirkwall
1998 : Hawksley Hill
1997 : El Angelo
1996 : Gentlemen (ARG)
1995 : Caesour
1994 : Blues Traveller
1993 : Slew of Damascus
1992 : Forty Niner Days
1991 : French Seventyfive
1990 : Robinski
1989 : Ten Keys
1988 : Wait Till Monday
1987 : Show Dancer
1986 : Palace Music

1985 : Drumalis
1984 : Scruples
1983 : Interco
1982 : Super Moment
1981 : Super Moment
1980 : Super Moment
1979 : Leonotis
1978 : Bywayofchicago
1977 : Painted wagon
1976 : Lifes Hope
1975 : Bahia Key
1974 : Indefatigable
1973 : Partners Hope
1963 : Mustard Plaster
1962 : Sea Orbit
1960 : Prize Host
1959 : Promised Land
1952 : Moonrush
1947 : Artillery
1946 : Adrogue
1940 : Sweepida
1938 : Seabiscuit
1937 : Seabiscuit
1936 : Special Agent
1935 : Head Play
1934 : Time Supply

External links
Bay Meadows official web site

Bay Meadows Racetrack
Previously graded stakes races in the United States
Horse races in California
Open mile category horse races
Turf races in the United States
Sports in the San Francisco Bay Area
Recurring sporting events established in 1934
Recurring events disestablished in 2007
1934 establishments in California
2007 disestablishments in California